Edward Vincent Bracken (February 7, 1915 – November 14, 2002) was an American actor. Bracken became a Hollywood comedy legend with lead performances in the films Hail the Conquering Hero and The Miracle of Morgan's Creek both from 1944, both of which have been preserved by the National Film Registry. During this era, he also had success on Broadway, with performances in plays like Too Many Girls (1940).

Bracken's later movie roles include National Lampoon's Vacation (1983), Oscar (1991), Home Alone 2: Lost in New York (1992), Rookie of the Year (1993), and Baby's Day Out (1994).

Life and career

Edward Vincent Bracken was born in Astoria, Queens, New York on February 7, 1915, the son of Joseph L.  and Catherine Bracken. Bracken performed in vaudeville at the age of nine and gained fame with the Broadway musical Too Many Girls in a role he reprised for the 1940 film adaptation. He had performed in a short film series called The Kiddie Troupers (one of many Our Gang-like series) prior to that, but that film was his big break. In 1936, Bracken enjoyed success on Broadway with his starring run in the Joseph Viertel play So Proudly We Hail. The military drama, co-starring Richard Cromwell, opened to much fanfare but closed after 14 performances at the 46th Street Theatre.

In the 1940s, director Preston Sturges cast Bracken in two of his best-loved films, The Miracle of Morgan's Creek, opposite Betty Hutton, and Hail the Conquering Hero. Due to the popularity of these films, Eddie Bracken was a household name during World War II. He made numerous radio broadcasts and had his own program, The Eddie Bracken Show.

In 1953, Bracken left Hollywood. He appeared on Broadway in Shinbone Alley; Hello, Dolly!; The Odd Couple; and Sugar Babies. His last appearance on Broadway was in the musical Dreamtime, directed by David Niles at the Ed Sullivan Theater, at the age of 77.

Bracken's extensive television roles between 1952 and 2000 include an episode of The Golden Girls as Rose Nylund's ex-childhood boyfriend from St. Olaf, as well as an episode of Tales from the Darkside playing a stubborn old man who refuses to believe that he has died.  After nearly 30 years out of feature films, he returned to perform character roles, including the sympathetic Walley World theme park founder Mr. Roy Walley in National Lampoon's Vacation(1983) and Duncan's Toy Chest toy store owner Mr. Duncan in Home Alone 2: Lost in New York (1992). Bracken also had a long career with Paper Mill Playhouse in New Jersey, starring in dozens of productions in the 1980s–early 2000s. One high point was their production of Show Boat in which he played Captain Andy Hawkes. This production was broadcast on PBS in 1990. He also played a cameo in Patrick Read Johnson's 1994 film, Baby's Day Out, as one of the veterans in the old soldier's home.

Bracken acted in films with two actors who later became U.S. Presidents: Ronald Reagan and Donald Trump. He co-starred in The Girl from Jones Beach with Reagan in 1949, and Trump played minor parts in Home Alone 2: Lost in New York in 1992.

Death
On November 14, 2002, Bracken died in Glen Ridge, New Jersey, of complications from surgery for a crushed disk in his neck at the age of 87. His wife of 63 years, Connie Nickerson, a former actress, died in August 2002, just three months before his death. He met Connie when they performed together in a road company of the Broadway play What a Life in 1938. Together Eddie and Connie had five children: two sons (Michael and David) and three daughters (Judy, Carolyn and Susan).

Hollywood Walk of Fame
For his contributions to radio and television, Bracken has two stars on the Hollywood Walk of Fame, at 1651 Vine Street and 6751 Hollywood Boulevard respectively.

Filmography

Pacific Liner (1939) as Junior officer (uncredited)
Too Many Girls (1940) as Jojo Jordan
Life with Henry (1941) as 'Dizzy' Stevens
Reaching for the Sun (1941) as Benny Hogan
Caught in the Draft (1941) as Bert Sparks
Safeguarding Military Information (1942) (short subject for military training) 
The Fleet's In (1942) as Barney Waters
Star Spangled Rhythm (1942) as Johnny Webster
Sweater Girl (1942) as Jack Mitchell
Happy Go Lucky (1943) as Wally Case
Young and Willing (1943) as George Bodell
The Miracle of Morgan's Creek (1944) as Norval Jones
Hail the Conquering Hero (1944) as Woodrow Truesmith
Rainbow Island (1944) as Toby Smith
Bring on the Girls (1945) as J. Newport Bates
Out of this World (1945) as Herbie Fenton
Duffy's Tavern (1945) as Eddie Bracken
Hold That Blonde (1945) as Ogden Spencer Trulow III
Ladies' Man (1947) as Henry Haskell
Fun on a Weekend (1947) as Pete Porter aka P.P. Porterhouse III
The Girl from Jones Beach (1949) as Chuck Donovan
Summer Stock (1950) as Orville Wingait
Two Tickets to Broadway (1951) as Lew Conway
About Face (1952) as Biff Roberts
We're Not Married! (1952) as Wilson Boswell 'Willie' Fisher
The Gulf Playhouse (Television series, 1952) as Lt. Merivale R. Colquhoun
A Slight Case of Larceny (1953) as Frederick Winthrop Clopp
Lux Video Theatre (Television series, 1953) as Larry
Schlitz Playhouse (Television series, 1953–1956) as Gunner's Mate
Playhouse 90 (Television series, 1957) as Stephen Minch
The Roaring 20s (Television series, 1961) as Ace Johnson
Always on Sunday (1962) as Bit Part (uncredited)
Going My Way (Television series, 1962) as Danny Everett
Rawhide (Television series, 1963–1964) as Edgar Allan Smithers / Morris G. Stevens
Burke's Law (Television series, 1964–1965) as Simeon Quatraine / 'Evil Eye' Hatton
Shinbone Alley (1970) as Archy (voice) 
The New Dick Van Dyke Show (Television series, 1973) as Eddie
Busting Loose (Television series, 1977) 
National Lampoon's Vacation (1983) as Roy Walley
Tales from the Darkside (Television series, 1984) 'A Case of the Stubborns' as Grandpa
Murder, She Wrote (Television series, 1985) as Barney Ogden
The Wind in the Willows (1987) as Moley
The Golden Girls (Television series, 1990) as Buzz
Oscar (1991) as Five Spot Charlie
Home Alone 2: Lost in New York (1992) as E.F. Duncan
Rookie of the Year (1993) as Bob Carson
Baby's Day Out (1994) as Old Timer
The Brave Little Toaster to the Rescue (1997) as Sebastian (voice) (direct-to-video)

Stage credits

Lottery (1930)
The Man in Stilts (1931) 
The Lady Refuses (1933)
The Drunkard (1934)
Life's Too Short (1935)
So Proudly We Hail (1936)
Iron Men (1936)
Brother Rat (1937) 
What A Life (1938–1939)
Too Many Girls (1939)
The Seven Year Itch (1953–1959)
The Tender Trap (1953–1956)
Will Success Spoil Rock Hunter? (1956) 
The Teahouse of the August Moon (1956)
Shinbone Alley (1957)
Three Men on a Horse (1957) 
The Tunnel of Love (1958)
Where's Charley? (1958) 
Visit to a Small Planet (1958)
Say Darling (1959) 
The Golden Fleecing (1960) 
Finian's Rainbow (1960) 
Mister Roberts (1960)
Beg, Borrow or Steal (1960)
Hot September (1965) (closed on the road)
The Odd Couple (1965)
You Know I Can't Hear You When the Water's Running (1967–1968)
The Girl in the Freudian Slip (1972) 
Never Too Late (1973) 
Born Yesterday (1974) 
The Sunshine Boys (1975) 
Hot Line to Heaven (1975) 
Hello Dolly! (1977–1980)
Show Boat (1979–1980) 
Sugar Babies (1981–1982)
Damn Yankees (1981) 
Kismet (1984) 
Show Boat (1985) 
Sugar Babies (1986–1987) 
Show Boat (1988–1989) 
Babes in Toyland (1991) 
The Wizard of Oz (1992) 
Dreamtime (1992)
It Runs in the Family (1993–1994) 
These Golden Years (1996) 
No, No, Nanette (1997) 
Follies (1998) 
The Student Prince (2000)
Carousel (2001)

Radio appearances

References

External links

1915 births
2002 deaths
American male film actors
American male voice actors
American male radio actors
American male stage actors
American male musical theatre actors
People from Astoria, Queens
People from Glen Ridge, New Jersey
Vaudeville performers
20th-century American male actors
American male television actors
American male comedians
21st-century American male actors
Male actors from New York City
Comedians from New York City
20th-century American comedians
21st-century American comedians
20th-century American singers
20th-century American male singers